Laiqzada Laiq (born; 15 January 1959, Madyan, Swat) is a Pashto language poet from Pakistan.

Biography
Laiq graduated from Jahanzeb College Swat, got a master's degree in Urdu and Pashto literature from University of Peshawar and political science from  University of Karachi. He is also working in Radio Pakistan as a director.

References

1959 births
Living people
Pakistani male singers
Pashto-language singers
Pashtun people
People from Swat District
Recipients of Tamgha-e-Imtiaz
University of Peshawar alumni
University of Karachi alumni